His Jazz Bride is a 1926 American silent drama film released by Warner Brothers Pictures. The movie starred Marie Prevost and Matt Moore.

Cast
Marie Prevost as Gloria Gregory
Matt Moore as Dick Gregory
Gayne Whitman 
John Patrick
Mabel Julienne Scott
Stanley Wayburn
Don Alvarado
Helen Dunbar
George Irving
George Seddon

Preservation status
It is unknown if a copy of the film survives. Warner Bros. records of the film's negative have a notation, "Junked 12/27/48" (i.e., December 27, 1948). Warner Bros. destroyed many of its negatives in the late 1940s and 1950s due to nitrate film pre-1933 decomposition. Or in February 1956, Jack Warner sold the rights to all of his pre-December 1949 films to Associated Artists Productions. In 1969, UA donated 16mm prints of some Warner Bros. films from outside the United States. However, a few sources show no surviving copies, which suggests that it is a lost film.

See also 
Three Weeks in Paris
Silent movie
Tom Moore
Owen Moore
List of Warner Bros. films

References

External links

1926 films
Lost American films
Warner Bros. films
1926 drama films
American silent feature films
American black-and-white films
Silent American drama films
1926 lost films
Lost drama films
Films directed by Herman C. Raymaker
1920s American films